E350 or E-350 may refer to:
 E350 (food additive), an EU recognised food additive
 E-350, a Ford E-Series van or minibus
 E-350, in the List of AMD Accelerated Processing Unit microprocessors
 E350, a Mercedes-Benz E-Class sedan or wagon

See also
 Canon EOS 350D, a digital single-lens reflex camera